Eteobalea enchrysa is a moth in the family Cosmopterigidae. It is found in North America, where it has been recorded from California.

Adults have been recorded on wing from April to June.

The larvae feed on Trichostema lanatum. Larval feeding causes stem galls.

References

Natural History Museum Lepidoptera generic names catalog

Eteobalea
Moths described in 1962